Richard Stephen Wilkins  (born 19 June 1954) is an Australian television and radio presenter.  He is the entertainment editor for the Nine Network, co-host of Weekend Today and weekend announcer on smoothfm, and master of ceremonies.

Biography

Early life, music and management
Wilkins was born in New Zealand on 19 June 1954, where he graduated from teachers' college, majoring in English and music. Using the name "Richard Wilde" he became an aspiring pop singer. PolyGram signed him to a worldwide deal.

In 1980, he brought his band Wilde And Reckless to Australia. He released some singles and a six-track EP, and toured with Grace Jones. He left the music industry to work behind the scenes as Promotions and Marketing Manager for Sydney radio stations 2Day FM and 2UW. He was part of the Australian Olympians' group which released the top-30 single "You're Not Alone".

In 2006, he returned to the stage for his role as Vince Fontaine in the mega-production "Grease: the Arena Spectacular".

Television career
Along with Joy Smithers and Alison Drower, Wilkins was the original host of MTV Australia when it launched on Nine in 1987.

In 1992, he hosted a game show called Keynotes, a summertime replacement for Sale of the Century. In 1999 he hosted the Australian version of Entertainment Tonight with Marie Patane. For ten consecutive years (excluding 1999–00), he hosted the Sydney New Year's Eve fireworks telecast. On 7 July 2007, Wilkins presented at the Australian leg of the Live Earth concert.

Wilkins has been the Nine's Network's Entertainment editor and presented daily features and interviews in showbusiness from around the world. He has also presented the Nine Network's coverage of The Academy Awards, The Golden Globe Awards, ARIA Awards and many other special events.

In 2019, Wilkins co-hosted Today Extra on Wednesday and Thursday due to David Campbell hosting Weekend Today. In 2020, Wilkins replaced David Campbell as co-host of Weekend Today.

Reporting live on the deaths of Farrah Fawcett and Michael Jackson on 26 June 2009, Wilkins erroneously reported the death of actor Jeff Goldblum on Today, although later in the program this was verified as a hoax.

Publication
In September 2011, he released his autobiography Black Ties, Red Carpets, Green Rooms, co-written with Carrie Hutchinson, which went on to be a bestseller.

Radio 
In May 2012, Wilkins started on smoothfm. He is the host of weekend Mornings (10am – 1pm) on smoothfm 91.5 in Melbourne and smoothfm 95.3 in Sydney.

30th anniversary
In 2017, Wilkins celebrated his 30th anniversary with the Nine Network. In January 2017, for the twelfth time, Wilkins co-hosted the annual G'Day USA Gala - the annual Australian event in the United States, at the behest of Foreign Minister Julie Bishop. In November 2017, Wilkins returned to host the ARIA awards from The Star in Sydney for the Nine Network.

Honours
Wilkins was presented with the Variety Club's "Heart of Variety" Award in 2000 for his outstanding humanitarian efforts.

In the 2014 Queen's Birthday Honours List, Wilkins was appointed a Member of the Order of Australia (AM), for "significant service to the community through a range of charities, and to the entertainment industry".

Richard has won two Australian Commercial Radio Awards for Best Music Special: for John Farnham and Michael Buble.

References

External links 

 
 

1954 births
Living people
Australian television presenters
Members of the Order of Australia
New Zealand emigrants to Australia
People educated at Palmerston North Boys' High School
Naturalised citizens of Australia